LaGrange School District 105 (D105) is a school district headquartered in LaGrange, Illinois, with its service area including southern LaGrange as well as all or part of Countryside and Hodgkins.

The first school in the area was in operation near Lyonsville in 1844. In 1945 the district had 279 students. In 1950 it had 728 students.

Schools
 Middle school: Gurrie Middle School
 Elementary schools:
Hodgkins Elementary School
Ideal Elementary School
Seventh Avenue Elementary School
Spring Avenue Elementary School

References

External links
 

School districts in Cook County, Illinois